Andenes–Gryllefjord Ferry is an automobile ferry service connecting the islands of Andøya (in Nordland county) and Senja (in Troms og Finnmark county) in Norway. Operated by Troms fylkestrafikk, the crossing between the villages of Andenes in Andøy Municipality and Gryllefjord in Senja Municipality takes 1 hour and 40 minutes. The service is only operated from late May until late August, and it has three crossings per day.

Both routes are classified as National Tourist Routes.

References

External links
https://www.tromskortet.no/ 

Car ferry lines in Nordland
Car ferry lines in Troms og Finnmark
Norwegian County Road 82
Andøy
Senja